ATT may refer to:
AT&T (disambiguation)
AT&T Inc., an American telecommunications company founded 1983 (formerly Southwestern Bell or SBC Communications)
AT&T Corporation, the original AT&T founded 1885 (formerly American Telephone & Telegraph), purchased by SBC in 2005
AT&T Mobility, a subsidiary of AT&T Inc. for wireless services.
AT&T Mexico, an international wireless subsidiary of AT&T Inc
Academy Transformation Trust, a multi-academy trust in England
Aircraft Transport and Travel, a 1910s British airline 
Amadou Toumani Touré, president of Mali
American Tobacco Trail
American Top Team, a mixed martial arts team based in Coconut Creek, Florida.
Arms Trade Treaty, a 2014 multilateral treaty to control the illicit trade of conventional weapons
Association of Taxation Technicians, a United Kingdom professional association
ATI Tray Tools - freeware program developed by Ray Adams for ATI Radeon video cards
Atmautluak Airport, an airport in Alaska (IATA: ATT)
A.T.T., a British dance music act.
Attachment, in biology (the binding of a virus to its target cell)
Attadale railway station, United Kingdom (National Rail code)
Attitude, in dynamics (aircraft attitude)
Attorney at law
Authorization to Transport, a permit issued in Canada to transport Restricted and Prohibited firearms
ATT, a codon for the amino acid isoleucine